Ollagüe Airport is an extremely high elevation airport in the Chilean altiplano.

See also

Transport in Chile
List of airports in Chile

References

External links
OpenStreetMap - Ollagüe Airport

Airports in Chile
Airports in Antofagasta Region